Maiestas intermedius is a species of bugs from the  Cicadellidae family that can only be found in Sri Lanka and Thailand. It was formerly placed within Recilia, but a 2009 revision moved it to Maiestas.

References

Insects described in 1903
Hemiptera of Asia
Maiestas